Thomas Flynn (born 23 November, 1990) is the English footballer, who plays for Whitley Bay.

Career
Flynn began his footballing career at Newcastle United's Academy, signing with Hibernian in 2007 summer. After progressing through the club's youth setup, he was one of seven players from the club's under-19 side to be given a full-time contract in 2009. Flynn was then loaned to Alloa Athletic in February 2010. At the end of the season, he returned to Hibernian.

On 13 August, 2010, Flynn rejoined Alloa on loan, after first-choice goalkeeper Jamie Ewings suffered an injury. In January 2011, he was loaned to Albion Rovers. He was released by Hibs on 29 April.

On 3 July, 2011, Flynn signed a one-year deal with Cowdenbeath. A year later, after having 14 clean sheets in 30 matches, he renewed his link with The Blue Brazil. On 11 August, 2012, Flynn made his Scottish Championship debut, in a 0–4 home defeat against Dunfermline. He left Cowdenbeath in October 2014.

In January 2015, Flynn signed for Football Conference side Alfreton Town.

References

External links

1990 births
Living people
Footballers from Newcastle upon Tyne
English footballers
Scottish Football League players
Scottish Professional Football League players
Association football goalkeepers
Alloa Athletic F.C. players
Albion Rovers F.C. players
Cowdenbeath F.C. players
Hibernian F.C. players
Alfreton Town F.C. players